Agapanthus inapertus, the Drakensberg agapanthus, drooping agapanthus, or closed African lily,  is a species of flowering plant in the family Amaryllidaceae, native to open grasslands, forest margins and mountainous, rocky areas of Mozambique, Eswatini (Swaziland), and South Africa (Transvaal and Natal).

Description 
The individual flowers remain barely open. It is a popular garden plant, The cultivar A. inapertus subsp. hollandii 'Sky' has an attractive drooping habit, and has received the Royal Horticultural Society's Award of Garden Merit.

Subspecies
Agapanthus inapertus subsp. hollandii (F.M.Leight.) F.M.Leight.
Agapanthus inapertus subsp. intermedius F.M.Leight.
Agapanthus inapertus subsp. pendulus (L.Bolus) F.M.Leight.

References

External links 

PlantZAfrica: Agapanthus inapertus

inapertus
Flora of Swaziland
Flora of Mozambique
Flora of KwaZulu-Natal
Flora of the Northern Provinces
Plants described in 1910